Heggelia is a village in Målselv Municipality in Troms og Finnmark county, Norway. The village is located along the river Barduelva and it is part of the commercial centre of Bardufoss.

References

Villages in Troms
Målselv
Populated places of Arctic Norway